Muhammad Shukri may refer to:

Muhammad Shukri (author) (1935-2003), Moroccan writer
Mohammad Shukri (cricketer), Malaysian cricketer
Muhammad Shukri Effendi, or Johannes Avetaranian, Turkish descendant of Muhammad, Christian convert and missionary